Pediodectes stevensonii, or Stevenson's shieldback, is a species of shield-backed katydid in the family Tettigoniidae.

References

Further reading

External links

 
 

Tettigoniinae
Insects described in 1870